Mount Misery is the dominant feature overlooking Huonville in southern Tasmania.

Geography 
The mountain divides the localities of Lucaston to the north east, Ranelagh to the south and Judbury to the west. The Russell Ridge Conservation Area to the north links Mount Misery Habitat Reserve to Mount Wellington Park. The mountain is entirely within the Huon Valley watershed.

Administration

Local government 
Mt Misery is within the Huon Valley Local Government Area.

Informal community habitat reserve 
Many of the land owners on the slopes of Mount Misery and surrounding areas share common nature conservation values.  these people own 68 individual titles and loosely apply the name "Mount Misery Habitat Reserve" to the protected area. About half of the titles are formally protected by conservation covenants that protect the natural values in perpetuity. These covenants include the first two conservation covenants issued in Tasmania. These covenants are created under the Private Forest Reserves Program operated by the Tasmanian government. Conservation covenants establish an agreement that sees important conservation values protected for biodiversity in perpetuity.

Land usage 
Most of the land is used for nature-focused residences. Some is used solely for conservation, a few are used as weekend getaways and one group of five titles is an ecotourism resort.

Vegetation 
The southern slopes are predominantly tall wet eucalyptus forest with small pockets of rainforest, growing in shallow peaty soils. The northern slopes are dry Eucalyptus tenuiramis on shallow mudstone soils. Most of the land is open grassland.

Some trees are  meters tall.

Access 
Public access is via a  walking track through rainforest and subalpine heathland to the boulders at the summit. Thirty interpretive panels explain the area's Aboriginal history and environmental issues. It takes approximately three hours to walk to the summit. There is no access charge.

The car park and track head are at Huon Bush Retreats, Browns Road, Ranelagh.

Gallery

References 

Mountains of Tasmania